François Omam-Biyik (born 21 May 1966) is a Cameroonian football manager and former player who works as assistant manager of Cameroon.

Omam-Biyik also has French nationality. A forward, he was one of the most important players of the Cameroon national team in the nineties, playing at the three World Cups in 1990, 1994 and 1998. He played 73 international matches in total.

Early life
Omam-Biyik started out as a goalkeeper, and later a defender, before converting into a striker at the age of 16.

Club career
Omam-Biyik had success with different French clubs before moving to Marseille in the summer of 1992. He only played one match, and was transferred to Lens in October 1992. After a few years he continued his career in Mexico with Club América and Puebla F.C., with short stops in European clubs towards the late nineties. Omam-Biyik retired after the 1999–2000 season.

In 1987 and 1991 he finished third in a run for an African Footballer of the Year award.

In 2003, he played in the Adecmac amateur soccer league in Mexico City with Club Deportivo Sahara, where he scored 10 goals in the season.

International career
Omam-Biyik's greatest moment came when he scored the downward header that gave Cameroon a historic 1–0 win over defending world champions Argentina in the San Siro in the opening match of the 1990 World Cup. He and his brother André helped Cameroon to the quarter-finals.

He also scored against Sweden in the first round of the 1994 World Cup.

He was called up to 1998 World Cup, which was his third.

Omam-Biyik scored a total of 26 goals in 73 appearances. He is Cameroon's record World Cup player, with 11 matches in three tournaments.

Style of play
Omam-Biyik's aerial ability led to the term "Omam-Biyik" being used as a nickname for a headed goal. While he took part in high jumping at school, he says he was "born" with his heading ability.

Managerial career
Following his retirement Omam-Biyik moved to Colima, Mexico, where he was the head coach of the city's Second Division professional soccer team.

Omam-Biyik was appointed assistant coach of the Indomitable Lions (Cameroon football team) for a two-year tenure, with Spaniard Javier Clemente as head coach.

Omam-Biyik became the head coach of Togolese side Gomido FC in May 2013. He pledged to help rebuild the first team but worked with the club for just two months.

On 20 July 2013, Omam-Biyik was signed to coach Gabonese champions Union Sportive de Bitam, replacing his compatriot Thomas Libiih.

At the end of September 2019, Omam-Biyik was appointed assistant manager under newly hired manager Toni Conceição for Cameroon.

Personal life
He is the father of Emilio Omam-Biyik and cousin of Francis Eliezer Omam, both of whom are footballers. François' older brother, André, and André's son, Jean-Armel, are also footballers.

Honours
Lens
 Coupe de la Ligue: 1994

Cameroon
 Africa Cup of Nations: 1988

References

External links
 
 

1966 births
Living people
Association football forwards
Cameroonian footballers
Stade Lavallois players
Stade Rennais F.C. players
AS Cannes players
Olympique de Marseille players
RC Lens players
LB Châteauroux players
Ligue 1 players
Ligue 2 players
Serie A players
U.C. Sampdoria players
Cameroonian expatriate footballers
Cameroonian expatriate sportspeople in France
Cameroonian expatriate sportspeople in Italy
Cameroonian expatriate sportspeople in Mexico
Expatriate footballers in France
Expatriate footballers in Italy
Expatriate footballers in Mexico
French footballers
Club América footballers
Atlante F.C. footballers
Club Puebla players
Liga MX players
Cameroon international footballers
1990 FIFA World Cup players
1994 FIFA World Cup players
1998 FIFA World Cup players
Africa Cup of Nations-winning players
1988 African Cup of Nations players
1990 African Cup of Nations players
1992 African Cup of Nations players
1996 African Cup of Nations players
Cameroonian emigrants to France
Canon Yaoundé players